Phractura brevicauda is a species of catfish in the genus Phractura. The fish can be found in coastal rivers north of Ogowe River to Loeme River, as well as in the Lobi River and Kribi River, and the Lower Congo River.

References

brevicauda
Freshwater fish of Central Africa
Fish described in 1902

Taxa named by George Albert Boulenger